Hibiscus mutabilis, also known as the Confederate rose, Dixie rosemallow, cotton rose or cotton rosemallow, is a plant long cultivated for its showy flowers. Originally native to southern China, it is now found on all continents except Antarctica.

Confederate roses tend to be shrubby or treelike in zones 9 and 10, though they behave more like perennials further north. The 'Rubra' variety has red flowers. Single blooming flowers are generally cup-shaped. Bloom season usually lasts from summer through fall. Propagation by cuttings root easiest in early spring, but cuttings can be taken at almost any time. These plants have a very fast growth rate. The Confederate rose was at one time very common in the area of the Confederate States of America, which is how its common name was derived. It grows well in full sun or partial shade, and prefers rich, well-drained soil.

The flowers are attractive to pollinators, including the specialized bee Ptilothrix bombiformis.

In cultivation in the UK, Hibiscus mutabilis has gained the Royal Horticultural Society's Award of Garden Merit.

Floral color change
Floral color change occurs in H. mutabilis when flowers are white in the morning, turning pink during noon and red in the evening of the same day. Under laboratory conditions, the color change of the petals was slower than that of flowers under outdoor conditions. Temperature may be an important factor affecting the rate of colour change as white flowers kept in the refrigerator remain white until they are taken out to warm, whereupon they slowly turn pink.

The red flowers remain on plants for several days before they abort. Weight of a single detached flower was  when white,  when pink and  when red. Anthocyanin content of red flowers was three times that of pink flowers and eight times that of white flowers. There was a significant increase in phenolic content with color change. Overall ranking of antioxidant properties of H. mutabilis flowers was red > pink > white.

Subramanian and Nair postulated that anthocyanins in pink and red flowers of H. mutabilis are synthesized independently since there is no reduction in phenolic content. However, Lowry suggested that anthocyanins are formed through direct conversion from flavonols as they have structural similarities.

References

mutabilis
Plants described in 1753
Taxa named by Carl Linnaeus